General Kozlov may refer to:

Dmitry Timofeyevich Kozlov (1896–1967), Soviet Army lieutenant general
Oleg Kozlov (born 1963), Russian Army major general
Vasily Kozlov (politician) (1903–1967), Soviet Army major general